George Meeker (March 5, 1904 – August 19, 1984) was an American character film and Broadway actor.

A graduate of the American Academy of Dramatic Arts, Meeker made several films such as Crime, Inc. (1945) and A Thief in the Dark (1928), and he played an uncredited part in All Through the Night (1941).

Meeker has a star at 6101 Hollywood Boulevard in the Motion Pictures section of the Hollywood Walk of Fame.

Meeker's Broadway credits include Conflict (1929), Back Here (1928), Judy (1927), A Lady's Virtue (1925), and Judy Drops In (1924).

Selected filmography

 Four Sons (1928) - Andreas - Her Son
 The Escape (1928) - Dr. Don Elliott
 A Thief in the Dark (1928) - Ernest
 Chicken a La King (1928) - Buck Taylor
 Girl-Shy Cowboy (1928) - Harry Lasser
 Strictly Dishonorable (1931) - Henry
 Emma (1932) - Bill Smith
 Fireman, Save My Child (1932) - Stevens (uncredited)
 A Fool's Advice (1932) - Harry Bayliss
 The Misleading Lady (1932) - Bob Tracy
 The Famous Ferguson Case (1932) - Jigger Bolton
 The First Year (1932) - Dick Loring
 Back Street (1932) - Kurt Shendler
 Blessed Event (1932) - Cromwell Church - the Announcer (uncredited)
 Vanity Street (1932) - Val French
 Afraid to Talk (1932) - Lenny Collins
 The Match King (1932) - Erickson (uncredited)
 Sweepings (1933) - Bert Pardway
 Pick-Up (1933) - Artie Logan (uncredited)
 Night of Terror (1933) - Prof. Arthur Hornsby
 Song of the Eagle (1933) - August Hoffmann
 The Life of Jimmy Dolan (1933) - Charles Magee
 Double Harness (1933) - Dennis Moore
 Chance at Heaven (1933) - Sid Larrick
 Only Yesterday (1933) - Dave Reynolds
 King for a Night (1933) - John Williams
 Hi, Nellie! (1934) - Sheldon
 Dark Hazard (1934) - Pres Barrow
 Hips, Hips, Hooray! (1934) - Beauchamp
 Ever Since Eve (1934) - Philip Baxter
 Melody in Spring (1934) - Wesley Prebble
 Uncertain Lady (1934) - Dr. Alexander Garrison
 I Believed in You (1934) - Saracen Jones
 Little Man, What Now? (1934) - Schultz
 Paris Interlude (1934) - Rex
 The Dragon Murder Case (1934) - Monty Montague
 The Richest Girl in the World (1934) - Donald
 Against the Law (1934) - Bert Andrews
 Broadway Bill (1934) - Henry Early
 Bachelor of Arts (1934) - Prof. Donald Woolsey
 Murder on a Honeymoon (1935) - Tom Kelsey, Alias Roswell T. Forrest
 The Wedding Night (1935) - Gilly (uncredited)
 Oil for the Lamps of China (1935) - Bill Kendall
 Don't Bet on Blondes (1935) - Minor Role (scenes deleted)
 Dante's Inferno (1935) - Drunk at Ship's Cafe (uncredited)
 Welcome Home (1935) - Edward Adams
 Manhattan Butterfly (1935)
 Murder by Television (1935) - Richard Grayson
 The Rainmakers (1935) - Orville Parker
 Remember Last Night? (1935) - Vic Huling
 If You Could Only Cook (1935) - Parker (uncredited)
 Don't Get Personal (1936) - Freddie Miller
 Tango (1936) - Foster Carver, Tony's Brother
 The Country Doctor (1936) - Dr. Wilson
 In Paris, A.W.O.L. (1936) - David
 Mr. Deeds Goes to Town (1936) - Henneberry (uncredited)
 Gentle Julia (1936) - Crum
 Neighborhood House (1936) - Adolph, Theatre Manager
 Walking on Air (1936) - Tom Quinlan
 Wedding Present (1936) - Gordon Blaker
 Career Woman (1936) - Mr. Smith
 Beware of Ladies (1936) - Freddie White
 History Is Made at Night (1937) - Mr. Norton
 The Man Who Found Himself (1937) - Howard Dennis (uncredited)
 On Again-Off Again (1937) - Tony
 Stella Dallas (1937) - Spencer Chandler (uncredited)
 Escape by Night (1937) - Fred Peters
 Music for Madame (1937) - Orchestra Leader (uncredited)
 The Westland Case (1937) - Richard Bolston
 Tarzan's Revenge (1938) - Nevin Potter
 Change of Heart (1938) - Richards (uncredited)
 Reckless Living (1938) - Man at Race Track (uncredited)
 Danger on the Air (1938) - Tuttle
 Having Wonderful Time (1938) - Subway Masher (uncredited)
 Marie Antoinette (1938) - Robespierre
 Smashing the Rackets (1938) - District Attorney Aide (uncredited)
 Slander House (1938) - Dr. Herbert Stallings
 Crime Takes a Holiday (1938) - Chuck (uncredited)
 Long Shot (1939) - Dell Baker
 Wings of the Navy (1939) - Steve Connors (uncredited)
 Rough Riders' Round-up (1939) - George Lanning
 The Lady and the Mob (1939) - George Watson
 The Kid from Texas (1939) - Henry Smith Harrington (uncredited)
 It's a Wonderful World (1939) - Ned Brown (uncredited)
 Undercover Doctor (1939) - Dapper Dan Barr
 The Jones Family in Hollywood (1939) - Movie Studio Actor (uncredited)
 Stunt Pilot (1939) - Earl Martin
 Everything's on Ice (1939) - Harrison Gregg
 The Roaring Twenties (1939) - Masters
 A Child Is Born (1939) - Mr. Harry Laverne (uncredited)
 Nick Carter, Master Detective (1939) - Hartley (uncredited)
 All Women Have Secrets (1939) - Doc
 Gone with the Wind (1939) - Poker-Playing Captain (uncredited)
 Escape to Paradise (1939) - Harry Wilson (uncredited)
 Swanee River (1939) - Henry Foster
 Free, Blonde and 21 (1940) - Drunk (uncredited)
 Sandy Is a Lady (1940) - Mr. Porter, The Writer
 Yesterday's Heroes (1940) - Tony
 A Night at Earl Carroll's (1940) - Stage Manager
 Michael Shayne, Private Detective (1940) - Harry Grange
 High Sierra (1941) - Pfiffer
 The Singing Hill (1941) - John R. Ramsey
 Affectionately Yours (1941) - Anita's Escort (uncredited)
 Love Crazy (1941) - DeWest
 Mountain Moonlight (1941) - Long
 Hurricane Smith (1941) - Joan's Boss (uncredited)
 Dive Bomber (1941) - Tom (uncredited)
 Marry the Boss's Daughter (1941) - Snavely
 The Body Disappears (1941) - (scenes deleted)
 You're in the Army Now (1941) - Captain Austin
 All Through the Night (1942) - Reporter (uncredited)
 Captains of the Clouds (1942) - Playboy
 The Male Animal (1942) - Reporter on Porch (uncredited)
 Murder in the Big House (1942) - 'Scoop' Conner
 Larceny, Inc. (1942) - Mr. Jackson
 Yankee Doodle Dandy (1942) - Hotel Clerk #1 (uncredited)
 Spy Ship (1942) - Paul
 Wings for the Eagle (1942) - Personnel Man
 The Gay Sisters (1942) - Dick's Boss (uncredited)
 Secret Enemies (1942) - Rudolph Dietz - Desk clerk
 Busses Roar (1942) - Nick Stoddard
 You Can't Escape Forever (1942) - Cummings - Greer's Lawyer (uncredited)
 Casablanca (1942) - Rick's friend (uncredited)
 The Ox-Bow Incident (1943) - Mr. Swanson (uncredited)
 Son of Dracula (1943) - Party Guest (uncredited)
 Up in Arms (1944) - Ashley's Aide
 Take It Big (1944) - John Hankinson
 Silent Partner (1944) - R.S. Treavor, Desk Clerk
 Seven Doors to Death (1944) - Charles Eaton
 Song of Nevada (1944) - Chris Calahan
 The Port of 40 Thieves (1944) - Frederick St. Clair
 Marriage Is a Private Affair (1944) - Jonesy (uncredited)
 Bowery to Broadway (1944) - Harvey's Man (uncredited)
 I Accuse My Parents (1944) - Charles Blake
 Dead Man's Eyes (1944) - Nick Phillips
 The Big Show-Off (1945) - Wally Porter
 Eadie Was a Lady (1945) - Caleb Van Horn VIII (uncredited)
 Brenda Starr, Reporter (1945, Serial) - Frank Smith (uncredited)
 Docks of New York (1945) - Prince Egor Mallet
 A Guy, a Gal and a Pal (1945) - Granville Breckenridge
 Crime, Inc. (1945) - Barry North
 Blonde Ransom (1945) - Forbes
 Mr. Muggs Rides Again (1945) - Dollar Davis
 Crime Doctor's Warning (1945) - Mrs. Lake's Attorney #1 (uncredited)
 Come Out Fighting (1945) - Silk Henley
 Northwest Trail (1945) - Whitey Yeager
 Black Market Babies (1945) - Anthony Marsden
 The Red Dragon (1945) - Edmond Slade
 Just Before Dawn (1946) - Walter Foster (uncredited)
 Murder Is My Business (1946) - Carl Meldrum
 The People's Choice (1946) - Elmer Blodgett
 Chick Carter, Detective (1946) - Nick Pollo
 Below the Deadline (1946) - Jeffrey Hilton
 Angel on My Shoulder (1946) - Mr. Bentley (uncredited)
 Her Sister's Secret (1946) - Guy
 Home in Oklahoma (1946) - Steve McClory
 Apache Rose (1947) - Reed Calhoun
 Smash-Up, the Story of a Woman (1947) - Wolf, an Attorney (uncredited)
 Road to Rio (1947) - Sherman Mallory
 The Gay Ranchero (1948) - Vance Brados
 King of the Gamblers (1948) - Bernie Dupal
 The Dude Goes West (1948) - Gambler (uncredited)
 Superman (1948, Serial) - Driller
 Silver Trails (1948) - Will Jackson
 One Touch of Venus (1948) - Mr. Crust (uncredited)
 The Denver Kid (1948) - Dealer Andre
 Words and Music (1948) - Producer (uncredited)
 The Crime Doctor's Diary (1949) - Carl Anson (uncredited)
 Omoo-Omoo, the Shark God (1949) - Dr. Godfrey Long
 Sky Liner (1949) - Financier
 Ranger of Cherokee Strip (1949) - Eric Parsons
 The Invisible Monster (1950) - Harry Long
 Twilight in the Sierras (1950) - Matt Brunner
 Spoilers of the Plains (1951) - Scientist Jim
 Wells Fargo Gunmaster (1951) - Roulette Croupier
 Government Agents vs. Phantom Legion (1951) - Willard
 Honeychile (1951) - Gambler (uncredited)

References

External links

1904 births
1984 deaths
American male film actors
American male stage actors
Deaths from Alzheimer's disease
Deaths from dementia in California
20th-century American male actors
20th-century American male singers
20th-century American singers